Robert Steiner (born 7 December 1976), is a German mountain climber and writer.

Steiner was born in Stuttgart, Germany, and grew up in Ostelsheim in the Black Forest. After finishing his Abitur he studied Geography and German in Freiburg im Breisgau to become a teacher.

Steiner started mountain-climbing at the age of 17 and went on to climb the Eiger, Matterhorn and Grandes Jorasses. He then climbed Bigwall in British Columbia and took part in expeditions to Mount Everest, Langtang in Tibet, Rolwaling and Tien Shan. In 1997 he had a serious accident at Grandes Jorasses which made him review his attitude to climbing, after which he wrote his first book.

Works 
 Selig, wer in Träumen stirbt, 2002
 Stoneman, Panico Alpinverlag 2004
 Tod am Khan Tengri, Lorenz Saladin, Expeditionsbergsteiger und Fotograf, with Emil Zopfi. AS Verlag, Zürich 2009. .
 Allein unter Russen, Panico Alpinverlag 2010,

References 

1976 births
German mountain climbers
Sportspeople from Stuttgart
Living people
German male writers